Justyna Maria Kowalczyk-Tekieli (born 19 January 1983) is a Polish cross-country skier who has been competing since 2000.
Kowalczyk is a double Olympic Champion and a double World Champion. She is also the only skier to win the Tour de Ski four times in a row and one of two female skiers (the other being Finn Marjo Matikainen) to win the FIS Cross-Country World Cup three times in a row. Kowalczyk holds the all-time record for wins in the Tour de Ski with 14, and had 29 podiums in total. She also won the Vasaloppet women's edition in 2015.

She is a member of cross country ski department of AZS AWF Katowice and is coached by Aleksander Wierietielny.

Career

Raised in the mountainous Goral village of Kasina Wielka, Southern Poland, Kowalczyk took up cross country skiing at the age of 10. She then competed in her first FIS World Cup race at Cogne (ITA) in December 2001.

In 2002 she came second in the individual sprint at the World Junior Championships. She finished 31st in the individual sprint at the 2003 FIS Nordic World Ski Championships. Kowalczyk's first World Cup Victory was the 10 km classic race at Otepää on January 27, 2007. Kowalczyk was 3rd overall in the 2007 World Cup.

She won the overall 2008–09 Cross-Country Skiing World Cup. On 24 March 2009, Kowalczyk was awarded the Knight's Cross of the Order of Polonia Restituta.

At the 2009 world championships in Liberec, Kowalczyk won two gold medals, one in the women's pursuit (7.5 km classical + 7.5 km free technique), and another one in the 30 km mass start. She also secured a bronze medal in the 10 km classical event.

On 27 February 2010, Kowalczyk beat Norway's Marit Bjørgen by 0.3 seconds to win the gold medal in the women's 30 km classical event in the 2010 Winter Olympics.  She posted a time of one hour, 30 minutes, 33.7 seconds. She earned two more medals in Vancouver, taking silver behind Bjørgen in the individual sprint classic on 17 February 2010, and bronze in the 15 km pursuit on 19 February 2010.

Kowalczyk won the 10 km classical race in the 2014 Winter Olympics in Sochi on a broken foot. She did not finish 30 km freestyle race.

On 22 February 2015 won bronze medal of the World Championship 2015 in team sprint with Sylwia Jaśkowiec in Falun, Sweden.

She won the Vasaloppet ski marathon in 2015 with a time of 4:41:02. She also won the Birkebeinerrennet long-distance cross-country ski marathon held annually in Norway in 2017 and 2018.

Education
Kowalczyk graduated from the Jerzy Kukuczka University of Physical Education in Katowice with an M.A. and a Ph.D. degree in physical education in 2014 at the Bronisław Czech University of Physical Education in Kraków, where her dissertation was titled "The structure and volume of training load cross-country skiing on the background of the evolution of technology gear and different levels of sports".

2005 Suspension

At the 2005 World Championships, Kowalczyk competed but was subsequently disqualified for taking dexamethasone at the Under23 (U23) OPA (Alpine Nations) Intercontinental Cup competition in Oberstdorf, Germany back on 23 January 2005. Dexamethasone is a substance that is allowed Out-of-Competition but prohibited In-Competition. It acts as an anti-inflammatory and immunosuppressant. Kowalczyk used the substance to alleviate an Achilles tendon condition.

On 13 June 2005, the FIS Doping Panel issued a two-year suspension (23 January 2005 – 22 January 2007) for Kowalczyk. In late June 2005 FIS determined that since dexamethasone was a glucocorticosteroid, it was classified as a specified substance on the World Anti-Doping Agency (WADA) list of prohibited substances, and therefore the period of ineligibility for the first violation is at a maximum, one year's ineligibility. The FIS Doping Panel therefore reduced the suspension to one year.

Kowalczyk appealed to the Court of Arbitration for Sport (CAS) which held that Kowalczyk did not use Dexamethasone to enhance her sport performance. However, she acted negligently, but the measure of the negligence did not justify a one-year term of ineligibility. According to CAS, a reduced period of ineligibility ending 8 December 2005 (the day of the hearing) provided the fair and proportionate measure of sanction.

CAS criticised the FIS Doping Panel that their decision excluded any consideration of Kowalczyk's defence that she did not use the substance to enhance her sport performance. According to CAS, Kowalczyk had disclosed and substantiated her defence that Dexamethasone was not intended to enhance performance. She had submitted corresponding medical certifications to the FIS Doping Panel as proof of use in alleviating an Achilles tendon condition. Upon Kowalczyk's prima facie showing that her use of the substance was for medical reasons, the burden of proof shifted to FIS to prove the contrary.

Criticism of anti-asthma drugs
Kowalczyk criticized Marit Bjørgen and other competitors during the Olympic Games in 2010 for using anti-asthma drugs. Bjørgen won five medals in the Olympics, three of them gold. The drug is allowed by FIS if prescribed by an Olympic team physician. Kowalczyk later apologized for the timing of her statements, since the Games were still going on at the time. The asthma medication Marit Bjørgen was using, Symbicort, has since been removed from WADA's list of banned substances.

Cross-country skiing results
All results are sourced from the International Ski Federation (FIS).

Olympic Games
5 medals – (2 gold, 1 silver, 2 bronze)

World Championships
 8 medals – (2 gold, 3 silver, 3 bronze)

World Cup

 9 titles – (4 overall, 4 distance, 1 sprint)

Individual podiums
 50 victories – (31 , 19 ) 
 104 podiums – (64 , 40 )

Team podiums
 1 podium – (1 )

See also
 Sport in Poland
 Tour de Ski
 List of Polish people

References

https://www.olympic.org/justyna-kowalczyk - retrieved 16 January 2018

External links

 June 13, 2005 FIS Doping Control statement on Kowalczyk (Digitized version). – Accessed 30 July 2006
 July 13, 2005 FIS Newsflash statement on Kowalczyk's suspension (Digitized version). – Accessed 30 July 2006
 December 14, 2005 FIS Newsflash on her overturned suspension (Digitized version). – Accessed 30 July 2006
 Arbitration CAS 2005/A/918 Kowalczyk v/ FIS, award of 8 December 2005
 
 Justyna Kowalczyk awarded the most beautiful woman in Poland
 Justyna Kowalczyk Official Site
 Unofficial Site in English and Swedish

1983 births
Cross-country skiers at the 2006 Winter Olympics
Cross-country skiers at the 2007 Winter Universiade
Cross-country skiers at the 2010 Winter Olympics
Cross-country skiers at the 2014 Winter Olympics
Cross-country skiers at the 2018 Winter Olympics
Doping cases in cross-country skiing
Medalists at the 2007 Winter Universiade
Living people
People from Limanowa County
Polish Gorals
Polish female cross-country skiers
Polish sportspeople in doping cases
Olympic cross-country skiers of Poland
Olympic gold medalists for Poland
Olympic bronze medalists for Poland
Olympic silver medalists for Poland
Knights of the Order of Polonia Restituta
Olympic medalists in cross-country skiing
FIS Nordic World Ski Championships medalists in cross-country skiing
FIS Cross-Country World Cup champions
Medalists at the 2010 Winter Olympics
Medalists at the 2006 Winter Olympics
Sportspeople from Lesser Poland Voivodeship
Medalists at the 2014 Winter Olympics
Tour de Ski winners
Tour de Ski skiers
Universiade medalists in cross-country skiing
Universiade gold medalists for Poland